The Ambassador Extraordinary and Plenipotentiary of the Russian Federation to the Oriental Republic of Uruguay is the official representative of the President and the Government of the Russian Federation to the President and the Government of Uruguay.

The ambassador and his staff work at large in the Embassy of Russia in Montevideo. The ambassador to Uruguay is concurrently appointed as the Russian representative to the Latin American Integration Association.

History of diplomatic relations

Diplomatic relations at the mission level between the Soviet Union and Uruguay were first established in August 1926, although the missions were not opened until August 1933. The first representative, was appointed on 10 March 1934, and presented his credentials on 9 May 1934. Diplomatic relations were broken off by the government of Uruguay on 27 December 1935 and Minkin was recalled. Relations were re-established on 27 January 1943, with Sergei Orlov appointed envoy on 3 November 1943. On 30 November 1964 the mission was upgraded to the level of an embassy. With the dissolution of the Soviet Union in 1991, the Soviet ambassador, continued as representative of the Russian Federation until 1993.

List of representatives (1934 – present)

Representatives of the Soviet Union to Uruguay (1934 – 1991)

Representatives of the Russian Federation to Uruguay (1991 – present)

Notes

a.  Alexandre Minkine, The Brazilian Government claimed an involvement in the Brazilian uprising of 1935 therefore rupture of diplomatic relations.

b.  Sergei A. Orlov (1895 died in 1944 in Montevideo), 1944 (5) MARCH 5— Sergei Orlov, first Russian Minister to Uruguay after a five-year interruption in Russian-Uruguayan diplomatic relations, arrives in Montevideo. (Uruguay and the USSR re-established diplomatic relations in 1943.)

c.  S.R. Striganov Appointed Soviet Ambassador to Argentina Pravda, 27/9/78. the Presidium of the USSR Supreme Soviet has appointed Sergei Romanovich Striganov (born 1916) ambassador to the Argentine Republic, replacing Semen Petrovich Dyukarev, 64, who is retiring. Striganov is one of the most experienced Soviet diplomats in the field of relations with the … in Montevideo and Moscow were elevated to embassies, Striganov became the first Soviet ambassador to Uruguay.

d.  Vladimir Demidov ExteriorM - Uruguay Archivo Hiatórico Dipiomático Carta del Embajador de la URSS en eI Uruguay, Sr.N.V.Demidov 127 Documento 52 – 27.08.1972.

e.  Yan Anastasyevich Burlyai Y.A., b. 1947, a Ukrainian by birth, in 1965-1970 studied at the Moscow State Institute of International Relations of the Ministry of

References 

Uruguay-URSS: 60 años de relaciones diplomáticas, 1926-1986 :, Uruguay. Ministerio de Relaciones Exteriores, Soviet Union. Ministerstvo inostrannykh del – 1989, СССР - Уругвай: 60 лет дипломатических отношений: 1926 - 1986 1988

Uruguay
Russia
Ambassadors of Russia to Uruguay